Sylvain Bied (26 February 1965 – 18 February 2011) was a French professional football player and manager. He played as a goalkeeper.

Playing career 
Bied was a product of the Paris Saint-Germain youth academy. He was the third choice goalkeeper of the first team during the 1984–85 season, while integrating the squad at the age of 19. On 26 March 1985, Bied played his first and only match for PSG, a 4–2 league loss to Lens. He conceded the opening goal of the match in the first 84 seconds of play.

Bied left PSG in the summer of 1985 to join Valenciennes. He went on to play for Amiens, Melun, Orléans, Dijon, Angers, and Saint-Pryvé Saint-Hilaire before retiring in 1999.

Managerial career 
Bied was player-manager for Saint-Pryvé Saint-Hilaire in the last two years of his playing career. He then spent nine years as the goalkeeping coach for Amiens, Laval, FC Ailly-sur-Somme Samara, and Beauvais. In 2008, Bied became the manager of CSA Montières Étouvie.

Career statistics

References 

1965 births
2011 deaths
Footballers from Lyon
French football managers
Ligue 1 players
Ligue 2 players
Championnat National players
Association football goalkeepers
Association football goalkeeping coaches
Association football player-managers
Amiens SC players
Paris Saint-Germain F.C. players
Dijon FCO players
Saint-Pryvé Saint-Hilaire FC players
Angers SCO players
Valenciennes FC players
US Orléans players
AS Saint-Priest players
French Division 3 (1971–1993) players
French footballers